Malana Dagar is a small village and Union Conical of Kallur kot in the Punjab province of Pakistan. It is located at 32°7'0N 71°14'0E with an altitude of 187 metres and is situated on the main road of Bhakkar, 4 km away from Kallur Kot on the bank of the Sindh river. The population of Mallana Daggar is approximately 2000.The number of registered voters is 1200. Most of the people speak Saraiki, although some also speak Punjabi.

The main source of income is agriculture and most of the families have their own lands for cultivation. The most commonly cultivated crops are cotton, wheat, sugarcane and water melons.

References

Villages in Punjab, Pakistan